Simon van Slingelandt, lord of the manor of Patijnenburg (14 January 1664, in Dordrecht – 1 December 1736, in The Hague) was Grand Pensionary of Holland from 17 July 1727 to 1 December 1736.

Simon van Slingelandt was the son of Govert van Slingelandt, lord of Dubbeldam (1623–1690), pensionary of Rotterdam and ambassador to Prussia, Sweden, Poland (1656) and Denmark (1659). He was also the secretary of the Council of State in 1664 

Before becoming grand pensionary Van Slingelandt wrote several reports as preparation for the second Great Assembly (Dutch Tweede Grote Vergadering, a kind of Constitutional Convention to reform the constitution of the Dutch Republic, 28 November 1716 – 14 September 1717), in which he proposed to give the Council of State ("Raad van State") more power. He was convinced of the necessity to restrict the power of the cities and the provinces in order to strengthen the central power of the republic. The Great Assembly however ended in failure when nothing came from Van Slingelandts proposed reforms.

He was powerful in the United Provinces, being the grand pensionary of Holland, which contributed sixty percent of the tax income of the republic. Van Slingelandt was a staunch republican, who wanted to keep the House of Orange out of the centre of power. He was a strong advocate of an alliance with Great Britain; otherwise, he thought, the United Provinces wouldn't survive. He mediated peace between Great Britain and Austria in 1732 on the eve of the War of the Polish Succession and between France and Austria in 1736. His interpretation of the representative nature of the Dutch government were controversial and polemical at the time. However in the long run his ideas had a profound influence and are well supported in modern scholarship.

Simon van Slingelandt, a Master of Laws, was married to Susanna de Wildt (1666-1722) and Johanna Margaretha van Coesvelt, his housemaid (1726-1736).

References

Further reading
 Drejer, Bert. "Representative Government in the Dutch Provinces: The Controversy over the Stadtholderate (1705–1707) and Simon van Slingelandt." Contributions to the History of Concepts 15.1 (2020): 76-96. online
Adriaan Goslinga, Slingelandt's efforts towards European peace, Martinus Nijhoff The Hague 1915.
Piotr Napierała, Simon van Slingelandt (1664–1736) – last chance of the Dutch Republic, Libron-Filip Lohner, Kraków 2013. 
 Arend van Essen, Staatsbelang boven regentengezang: de politieke traktaten van Simon van Slingelandt (1664-1736) en het functioneren van de Republiek'', Rijksuniversiteit Groningen (2021).Online version

External links 

Regeringsleiders van de Nederlanden 
Short biography

1664 births
1737 deaths
Grand Pensionaries
People from Dordrecht
Treasurers-General